The 1927 season was the Hawthorn Football Club's 3rd season in the Victorian Football League and 26th overall.

Fixture

Premiership Season

Ladder

References

Hawthorn Football Club seasons